Hubert Aleksander Wagner  (also known as Hubert Jerzy Wagner) (born 4 March 1941 – 13 March 2002) was a Polish volleyball player and coach. He was a member of the Poland national team from 1963 to 1971, a participant in the Olympic Games Mexico 1968 and a bronze medallist at the 1967 European Championship. As a head coach, he led Poland to the titles of the 1974 World Champions and the 1976 Olympic Champions.

Personal life
He was born in Poznań, Poland. His parents were Romuald and Zofia (née Kotlińska). He had younger siblings - sister Elżbieta (born 1946) and brother Leszek. Married twice. On October 15, 1963, he married Danuta Kordaczuk, who was volleyball player, medalist of Olympics, World and European Championships. With wife Danuta, he had one son Grzegorz Wagner (born 1965), who was also volleyball player (setter) and coach. They got divorced in 1978. In 1979 he was married to Anna Baraniecka. In last two years of his life, his partner was Danuta Marzec. He had two grandsons - Iwo (born 1991) also played as setter and now he works as scoutman, second grandson Jakub (born 1993) also is volleyball player and one granddaughter named Sara (born 2003).

Career as coach
In 1973 he became a head coach of Polish men's national volleyball team, when he was 32. He was known as a demanding coach, who attached great importance to physical preparation of their players. In 1974 he led Poland men's national volleyball team to first title of World Champions 1974 in history.

As World Champions his team was one of the main contenders for next title. Poland went to European Championship 1975 held in Yugoslavia and won silver medal.

Before going to Montreal for the Olympics he said: I am only interested in gold.

The tournament was fatiguing and hard for his team but Wagner completed plan. On July 30, 1976, he achieved with Polish men's national volleyball team title of Olympic Champions 1976. In final his team beat Soviet Union in tie-break, despite the fact that Polish volleyball players spent on the pitch 11,5 hours - a lot more time than opponents (5 hours) throughout the tournament. Two months after success he left national team.

Honours

As a player
 National championships
 1962/1963  Polish Championship, with AZS AWF Warsaw
 1964/1965  Polish Championship, with AZS AWF Warsaw
 1965/1966  Polish Championship, with AZS AWF Warsaw
 1967/1968  Polish Championship, with AZS AWF Warsaw

As a coach
 National championships
 1982/1983  Polish Championship, with Legia Warsaw
 1991/1992  Turkish Championship, with Halkbank Ankara
 1992/1993  Turkish Championship, with Halkbank Ankara

Death
On 13 March 2002 he left the hotel in Warsaw after a lively discussion at a meeting of members of the Polish Association of Volleyball, which he was secretary. Some time later he had car accident caused by his heart attack. Despite the rapid resuscitation he died. An autopsy showed advanced coronary artery disease. He was buried at the Northern Communal Cemetery in Warsaw.

Memory
Every year (since 2003) is organized Memorial of Hubert Jerzy Wagner, which is three-day tournament for four national teams invited by Poland. It is one of the most important and popular volleyball event in Poland. In 2010 Hubert Wagner joined to International Volleyball Hall of Fame. Five schools and two sports arenas in Poland are named after him.

References

External links
 

1941 births
2002 deaths
Sportspeople from Poznań
Polish men's volleyball players
Polish volleyball coaches
Volleyball coaches of international teams
Olympic volleyball players of Poland
Volleyball players at the 1968 Summer Olympics
Polish expatriate sportspeople in Turkey
Polish expatriate sportspeople in Tunisia
Legia Warsaw (volleyball) coaches